Ria Ramnarine (born 12 October 1978) is a Trinidadian and Tobagonian former professional boxer who competed from 1999 to 2012. During her career, she held world titles in two weight-classes; the WIBA minimumweight title from 2005 to 2006; the WIBF minimumweight and WIBA light flyweight titles in 2011. She also challenged once for the WBA female minimumweight title in 2010. She was Trinidad and Tobago's first female world champion.

Professional boxing record

References

External links
Minister likens education to divine light of Divali Trinidad Guardian - 13 October 2006

1978 births
Living people
Trinidad and Tobago women boxers
Trinidad and Tobago people of Indian descent
Trinidad and Tobago Hindus
Flyweight boxers